Lucas Daniel (born 1 January 1995) is a French competitive archer. He attained a fourth-place finish in the men's team recurve at the 2015 European Games, and eventually competed as a member of the French archery squad at the 2016 Summer Olympics.

Daniel was selected to compete for the French squad at the 2016 Summer Olympics in Rio de Janeiro, shooting in both individual and team recurve tournaments. First, Daniel amassed 666 points out of a maximum 720 to obtain a twenty-first seed heading to the knockout stage, along with his team's score of 2,003 collected from the classification round. Sitting at fifth in the men's team recurve, Daniel and his compatriots Pierre Plihon and Jean-Charles Valladont confidently beat the Malaysians in the opening round with a 2–6, before they faced a quarterfinal match against Australia, which led to the trio's untimely demise from the competition through a tough 3–5 defeat. In the men's individual recurve, Daniel succumbed to the reigning European Games champion Miguel Alvariño of Spain, who scored straight-set victories in the opening round.

References

External links
 
 
 
 

French male archers
Living people
People from Riom
1995 births
Archers at the 2015 European Games
European Games competitors for France
Archers at the 2016 Summer Olympics
Olympic archers of France
Sportspeople from Puy-de-Dôme